Aberdeen Lake may refer to:

Aberdeen Lake (Nunavut), Canada
Aberdeen Lake (La Tuque), Mauricie, Québec, Canada
Aberdeen Lake (Mississippi), United States

See also
Aberdeen (disambiguation)
Aberdeen Lake Formation, Ontario, Canada